Vizma may refer to:
Vizma (given name), a feminine given name
Vizma, Romania, a village in Secaș Commune of Timiș County, Romania
Vizma, a small tributary of the river Miniș in Timiș County, Romania
Vizma (Andoga), a tributary of the river Andoga in Vologda Oblast, Russia
Vizma, Russia, a rural locality (a settlement) in Belozersky District of Vologda Oblast, Russia